The Kernosivskyi idol, or Kernosivsky idol is a Kurgan stele dating from the mid–3rd millennium BC. It is held in the collection of the Dmytro Yavornytsky National Historical Museum of Dnipro.

Discovery 
The unique stele was found in 1973 in Kernosivka, Novomoskovsk district, by workmen who were digging a trench for a silo. Its importance went unrecognised and it was put aside for disposal, but school children found it and informed the Dmytro Yavornytsky National Historical Museum of Dnipro. It was named after the place that it was discovered by the museum archaeologist Lyudmila Krylova.

After accession and documentation, the sculpture was displayed at the Dnipro National Historical Museum. Local public interest was not significant, and the object was loaned for temporary display to the Pushkin Museum, where it was extremely popular. From Moscow, its loan transferred to the Hermitage Museum in Saint Petersburg, where it was displayed for three months. As a result of its popularity, and the wider context of the Hermitage's prehistoric collections, a request was made that the idol's permanent location should be at the Hermitage. Due to the work of the director of the Dnipro National Historical Museum, Horpyna Vatchenko, a change in terms of the loan was denied and the object returned to its home region. This return was also supported by Vatchenko's brother, Oleksiy Vatchenko, who was chairman of the Presidium of the Supreme Soviet of the Ukrainian Soviet Socialist Republic.

Description 
The sandstone sculpture is 120cm high, 36cm wide and 24cm deep. It is an anthropomorphic sculpture: the upper part shows a male figure with an elongated face, deep-set eyes and a moustache. The figure is nude; the only clothing worn are a belt and shoes. The figure's genitals are prominent. The lower segment of the block narrows and was buried in the ground. There is damage from its initial excavation by bulldozer to the right side of the figure. 

All four sides of the figure are covered with numerous drawings, sculpted in low relief. One interpretation of the artwork on the back of the figure is that it depicts a tree of life. Regular circles and squares above the ribs, symbolise the sun and the moon. These images testify to the ritual, sacred purpose of the stele. Other illustrations include: weaponry - a bow and arrow and a mace; tools - axes, a hoe, a crucible; animals - a bull, two horse and turtles; on one side a man and a woman are copulating; there are also geometric designs.

Dating and analysis 
After much controversy, the object was dated to the mid 3rd millennium BC and is associated with the late Yamnaya culture.

According to the most common hypothesis, it depicts the supreme deity of the Indo-European pantheon. This connection was first proposed by Ukrainian archaeologist Valentyn Danylenko, who also proposed a connection between the idol and stories from the Rigveda. However the object has no close parallels.

One interpretation of the illustrations on the body of the figure is that they may show tattoos.

Gallery

References 

Archaeology of Ukraine
Funerary steles
3rd-millennium BC steles